Noel Teggart (19 December 1941 – 6 August 1997) was an Irish cyclist. He competed in the individual road race and team time trial events at the 1972 Summer Olympics.

References

External links
 

1941 births
1997 deaths
Irish male cyclists
Olympic cyclists of Ireland
Cyclists at the 1972 Summer Olympics